Golden Oldies may refer to:

 Golden Oldies (album), a 2014 studio album by Focus
 Golden Oldies (TV program), a South Korean TV program
 "Golden Oldies", a 2019 song by Kaiser Chiefs
 "Golden Oldie" (song), a song by Anne Murray

See also
Oldies, a term for musical genres (e.g.pop music, rock and roll, doo-wop, surf music) from the mid-1950s to the 1980s